Oreosaurus luctuosus, the lightbulb lizard, is a species of lizard in the family Gymnophthalmidae. It is endemic to Venezuela.

References

Oreosaurus
Reptiles of Venezuela
Endemic fauna of Venezuela
Reptiles described in 1863
Taxa named by Wilhelm Peters
Taxa named by William W. Lamar